Abdu Rahiman Nagar  is a census town in Malappuram district in the state of Kerala, India.
It is also the name of a Grama Panchayat.

Demographics
 India census, Abdu Rahiman Nagar had a population of 35534 with 17262 males and 18272 females.

Etymology 
The name Abdu Rahiman Nagar came from the name of freedom fighter Mohammed Abdul Rahiman.

Transportation
A.R.Nagar village connects to other parts of India through Parappanangadi town.  National highway No.66 passes through A.R.Nagar and the northern stretch connects to Goa and Mumbai.  The southern stretch connects to Cochin and Trivandrum.   State Highway No.28 starts from Nilambur and connects to Ooty, Mysore and Bangalore through Highways.12,29 and 181.   The nearest airport is at Kozhikode.  The nearest major railway station is at Parappanangadi.

References

Image Gallery

Cities and towns in Malappuram district
Parappanangadi area